In geometry, the pentagonal rotunda is one of the Johnson solids. It can be seen as half of an icosidodecahedron, or as half of a pentagonal orthobirotunda. It has a total of 17 faces.

Formulae
The following formulae for volume, surface area, circumradius, and height are valid if all faces are regular, with edge length a:

Dual polyhedron
The dual of the pentagonal rotunda has 20 faces: 10 triangular, 5 rhombic, and 5 kites.

References

External links

Johnson solids